Michael Rose (born April 6, 1987) is an American professional basketball player for the Knox Raiders of the NBL1. He returns to the Raiders for a second year, where he won the Big V MVP in 2016 as well as making the State Championship. Rose attended Eastern Kentucky University, where he played college basketball, starting in over 100 games, before going on to play professionally in Europe, Australia and Canada.

High school career
Rose attended Neuqua Valley High School in Naperville, Illinois where he was rated the 30th-best prospect in the state of Illinois by ChicagoHoops.com. As a senior in 2004–05, he averaged 19.2 points, 7.5 rebounds, 1.8 assists and three steals per game as he led Neuqua Valley to a 24-4 record. He subsequently earned Upstate Eight All-Conference team and Illinois Basketball Coaches Association third team all-state accolades.

College career
As a freshman at Eastern Kentucky in 2005–06, Rose played in all 30 games with 16 starts and was twice named OVC Freshman of the Week in November 2005. He subsequently led all EKU freshmen in points (6.2 ppg), minutes (20.4 mpg), steals (25) and rebounds (2.7 rpg).

As a sophomore in 2006–07, Rose started all 33 games as he earned the OVC Tournament MVP and second-team All-OVC honors. He led the team and ranked sixth in the conference in scoring at 15.1 points per game, while also ranking third in the conference in three-point shooting at 39.8 percent.

As a junior in 2007–08, Rose started all 30 games as he led the team and ranked fifth in the conference in scoring at 15.3 points per game. He also ranked fifth in the conference in free throw shooting (81.5 percent) and fourth in steals (1.8 spg), subsequently earning first-team All-OVC honors. He became the 28th Colonel to reach the 1,000-point plateau when he scored a team-high 21 points against Tennessee Tech on February 2, 2008.

As a senior in 2008–09, Rose earned first-team All-OVC honors for the second straight year after averaging 20.0 points, 5.3 rebounds, 2.5 assists and 1.7 steals in 31 games (all starts). He also earned first-team NABC Division I All-District 19 honors along with Lester Hudson, Drake Reed, Kenneth Faried and Wes Channels.

Professional career

2009–10 season
Rose went undrafted in the 2009 NBA draft. In July 2009, he signed with Oyak Renault for the 2009–10 TBL season. However, he was released by the club in October 2009 after appearing in just one game.

On January 15, 2010, Rose signed with the Melbourne Tigers for the rest of the 2009–10 NBL season. In 8 games with the Tigers, he averaged 6.9 points, 2.5 rebounds and 1.0 steals per game.

Following the Tigers' final game of the season on February 13, Rose moved to New Zealand where he signed a short-term deal with the Southland Sharks on March 2. He left the team in April following the return of captain Luke Martin despite stating his claim as one of the best players in the league. In 7 games for the Sharks, he averaged 22.6 points, 6.6 rebounds, 2.1 assists and 2.6 steals per game.

2010–11 season
In September 2010, Rose signed with Gent Hawks of the Belgian second division for the 2010–11 season. In 29 games, he averaged 8.5 points and 1.9 rebounds per game.

On June 8, 2011, Rose returned to the Southland Sharks, signing with the club as an injury replacement for Kevin Braswell. In 8 games, he averaged 14.6 points, 3.5 rebounds, 1.5 assists and 1.8 steals per game.

2011–12 season
On January 30, 2012, Rose signed with the Sauk Valley Predators for the 2012 PBL season. In 17 games, he averaged 15.2 points, 3.5 rebounds, 2.2 assists and 1.6 steals per game.

2012–13 season
In October 2012, Rose joined the Crailsheim Merlins of the German second league for the 2012–13 season. On February 14, 2013, he signed with the Bulleen Boomers for the 2013 Big V season.

2013–14 season
On July 3, 2013, Rose signed with the Ottawa SkyHawks for the 2013–14 NBL Canada season.

2015–16 season
On March 11, 2016, Rose signed with the Knox Raiders for the 2016 Big V season. He went on to win the league's Most Valuable Player award.

2016–17 season
On December 12, 2016, Rose signed with the Hume City Broncos for the 2017 Big V season.

2018–19 season
In December 2018, Rose re-signed with the Knox Raiders for the 2019 NBL1 season.

References

External links
Eastern Kentucky bio
Big V stats
Knox Raiders Player Announcement

1987 births
Living people
African-American basketball players
American expatriate basketball people in Australia
American expatriate basketball people in Belgium
American expatriate basketball people in Canada
American expatriate basketball people in Germany
American expatriate basketball people in New Zealand
American expatriate basketball people in Turkey
American men's basketball players
Crailsheim Merlins players
Eastern Kentucky Colonels men's basketball players
Gent Hawks players
Melbourne Tigers players
Ottawa SkyHawks players
Oyak Renault basketball players
Shooting guards
Southland Sharks players
Sportspeople from Naperville, Illinois
21st-century African-American sportspeople
20th-century African-American people